The Future is an excursion train operated by the Taiwan Railways Administration (TRA) that is composed of refurbished Chu-Kuang Express rolling stock. As of November 2020, the train only operates if reserved in advance. The Future began services on 31 December 2020.

History 
In February 2019, the TRA introduced a newly refurbished excursion train to be used for round-island train services, with plans to complete a total of 29 cars. However, the public's reception to these cars were poor: some critics described its interior design as "unappealing" and "hideous". Some of these cars were further remodeled with a theme based around Hello Kitty, which were better received. Meanwhile, the TRA's director-general, Chang Chen-yuan, created a committee in April of "the harshest critics of the train" and allotted 13 not-yet refurbished cars to JC Architecture (柏成設計), a Taiwanese design firm, for redesign.

On 26 November 2019, the TRA announced that they are unveiling three new trainsets, each with its own theme: mountains (山景), ocean (海景), and sunset (夕景). Two days later, the first group of "sunset" themed cars rolled out of Taiwan Rolling Stock Company's plant in Hukou, Hsinchu. Between 13-22 December 2019, TRA held an exhibition in Taipei Station unveiling the design of the train, which was seen as a much better improvement. The train was recognized in the 2020 Good Design Award in Japan.

Design 
Thirteen cars were refurbished for the sunset-themed Future: five 10500 series, five 10600 series, and three 10700 series cars. Out of these trains, two are dining cars, three are lounge cars, and eight are passenger cars. The exterior of the "sunset" train is painted in black and orange, a color scheme never used by the TRA before. Faced with a limited budget, the designers left the general layout of the train the same. Less vibrant colors were used for a minimalistic approach. The designers intended on making all seats white, but the TRA had already purchased blue seats for its original excursion train design; therefore, only a third of the seats are white.

Operation 
The Future has no regular timetable; instead, the train is only used if reserved, either through the TRA or through package tours offered by third party tour operators. Future began services on 31 December 2020.

Gallery

References 

Named passenger trains
Railway services introduced in 2019